John Rees "Jack" Price (May 8, 1932 — May 24, 2011) was a Canadian professional ice hockey defenceman who played 57 games in the  National Hockey League for the Chicago Black Hawks between 1952 and 1954. The rest of his career, which lasted from 1952 to 1964, was spent in the minor leagues.

Career statistics

Regular season and playoffs

External links
 

1932 births
2011 deaths
Canadian ice hockey defencemen
Chicago Blackhawks players
Edmonton Flyers (WHL) players
Galt Black Hawks players
Galt Red Wings players
Hershey Bears players
Ice hockey people from Ontario
Ontario Hockey Association Senior A League (1890–1979) players
Ottawa Senators (QSHL) players
People from Goderich, Ontario
Pittsburgh Hornets players
Sudbury Wolves (EPHL) players
Windsor Bulldogs (1963–1964) players
Winnipeg Warriors (minor pro) players